The Talkeetna River (Taa’i Na’ in Ahtna; K'dalkitnu in Dena'ina) is a river in Alaska.

History
Tanaina Indian name reported in 1898 to mean "river of plenty" by G. H. Eldridge and Robert Muldrow, United States Geological Survey. or as K'dalkitnu (″food is stored river″).

Also known as:
Talkeet River
Talkeetno River
Talkutna River

Watershed

See also
List of rivers of Alaska

References

Rivers of Matanuska-Susitna Borough, Alaska
Rivers of Alaska